Habicht is the German word for the common hawk, accipiter gentilis. It can also refer to:

People
 Habicht (surname)

Places
 Habicht, mountain in the Stubai Alps in Austria

Planes
 DFS Habicht, 1936 aerobatic sailplane
 Messerschmitt Me 163S "Habicht", trainer version of Me 163
 Focke-Wulf A 20 "Habicht"

Boats
 :de:SMS Habicht (1860), Prussian gunboat
 , German gunboat
 :de:S69 Habicht, Albatros-Klasse speedboat of the German Navy
 :de:Habicht (1953), motorboat of German Railways on the Bodensee

Other
 Operation Habicht 1940 List of Axis named operations in the European Theatre: German diversionary attack on Mulhouse
 :de:Simson Habicht, a motorbike